(1509–1593) was a Japanese samurai of the Sengoku period, who served the Takeda clan. He was the head of Hoshina clan, son of Hoshina Masanori. Masatoshi served under Shingen from the latter's earliest campaigns and fought in many of battles.

He initially opposed Takeda Shingen's invasion of Shinano; however, he later submitted to Shingen and became a Takeda general, in command of 120 cavalry. 

Together with Sanada Yukitaka and Kōsaka Masanobu, he was one of the three "Danjo" (Danjō stands for a formal title, Danjōchū; 弾正忠) in the Takeda clan, distinguished from the others as "Yari Danjō" (槍弾正), due to his skilled use of the spear.

Masatoshi was succeeded by his son Hoshina Masanao.

Family
 Father: Hoshina Masanori
 Sons:
 Hoshina Masanao
 Hoshina Masakatsu
 Naito Masaaki (1550-1588)

References
 Family background on the Hoshina clan
Saigō Tanomo, Takagi Morinosuke (1913). Numasawa Michiko-kun no den. Tokyo: Numasawa Shichirō.
 "Takeda kashindan hitokoto fairu" (16 Feb. 2008)

Samurai
1509 births
1593 deaths
Hoshina clan
Takeda retainers